Much of the U. S. city of Portland, Oregon is built to a grid plan oriented north/south and east/west. However, the streets in the central downtown area are aligned to magnetic north—presumably at the time the area was platted—and so is oriented about 19.25° eastward.

The city is rated highly in "walkability", bicycle-friendliness and public transport provision. Urban growth has been controlled by the Metro planning authority since the 1970s.

Principal streets
 82nd Avenue
 Beaverton-Hillsdale Highway
 Broadway
 Burnside Street, east–west, runs uninterrupted on both sides of the Willamette River, serves as the dividing line between North Portland and South Portland
 Canyon Road
 Capitol Highway
 Cesar Chavez Boulevard, formerly known as Northeast and Southeast 39th Avenue
 Cornell Road
 Division Street
 Harbor Drive
 Martin Luther King Jr. Blvd., formerly Union Avenue (renamed in 1989). Carries Oregon Route 99E.
 Klickitat Street
 Hawthorne Boulevard
 Lombard Street
 Naito Parkway
 Williams Avenue, a north-south street that defines the eastern boundary of North Portland
 Stark Street (part of which has been designated Harvey Milk Street)
 Terwilliger Boulevard

See also

 Terwilliger curves
 The Simpsons and Portland, Oregon – many characters in The Simpsons are named after Portland streets
 Transportation in Portland, Oregon

References

External links
 

Portland
Streets